Stanchfield may refer to:

Places in the United States
 Stanchfield, Minnesota, a census-designated place
 Stanchfield Corner, Minnesota, an unincorporated community
 Stanchfield Creek, a creek in Minnesota
 Stanchfield Lake, a lake in Minnesota
 Stanchfield Township, Isanti County, Minnesota

People with the surname
 Daniel Stanchfield (1820–1908), American businessman, politician, and explorer
 Darby Stanchfield (born 1971), American actress
 John B. Stanchfield (1855–1921), American lawyer and politician
 Samuel B. Stanchfield (1837–1919), American politician
 Walt Stanchfield (1919-2000), American animator, teacher, and writer